Sphaerium solidum, the solid orb mussel, is a species of freshwater bivalve from family Sphaeriidae.

Distribution and conservation status 
 Not listed in IUCN Red List – not evaluated (NE)
 Germany – critically endangered (vom Aussterben bedroht) 
 Poland – endangered (EN)
 Slovakia

References

Sources 
 

solidum
Bivalves described in 1844